Live at the El Rey is a concert DVD featuring comic singer-songwriter Stephen Lynch. It is a live recording of a December 2003 Lynch performance at the El Rey Theatre in Los Angeles. The DVD includes a commentary track featuring Lynch and fellow performers, Drew Lynch (Stephen's younger brother) and Mark Teich. Other features include a clip from one of Lynch's earliest live performances (featuring "Jim Henson's Dead"), a clip of Lynch recording "Lullaby" in the studio for his first album, A Little Bit Special and a short film recorded by Lynch's wife, Erin Dwight, titled Lynch and Teich in Brooklyn.

Track listing
"Not Home"
"Baby"
"Special"
"Talk To Me"
"Priest"
"Grandfather"
"Gay"
"Superhero"
"Drink You Pretty"
"Craig"
"Taxi Driver"
"Love Song"
"For The Ladies"
"She Gotta Smile"
"Best Friends Song"
"Classic Rock Song"
"D&D"
"Kitten"
"Special Olympics" (appears as a hidden track)

External links

Stand-up comedy concert films
2004 films
2004 comedy films